Luise Zscheile (born December 30, 1993) is a German female acrobatic gymnast. With partners Nora Schaefer and Franca Schamber, Schaefer competed in the 2014 Acrobatic Gymnastics World Championships.

References

1993 births
Living people
German acrobatic gymnasts
Female acrobatic gymnasts